CKJJ-FM is a Christian music radio station, broadcasting at 102.3 FM in Belleville, Ontario, Canada. The station began broadcasting in 2003 and is owned by United Christian Broadcasters Canada (UCB).

Transmitters

The station also previously had a rebroadcaster in Chatham, which was converted to a new originating station, CKGW, in 2007.

In 2007, transmitters were added in Cobourg (100.9 MHz) and Brockville (99.9 MHz). 

On September 22, 2006, UCB was denied a licence for 106.5 MHz at Foymount.

On January 29, 2009, UCB applied for a broadcasting licence for 1480 kHz in Newmarket, which was the former frequency occupied by CKDX up until the 1990s; it is unknown if this application was approved.

On September 10, 2009, UCB applied to change Cobourg's CKJJ-FM-1 frequency from 100.9 to 90.7 MHz. This application was denied on January 26, 2010. They would apply for it again on September 27, 2010, this time receiving approval on February 21, 2011, after the original repeater was forced to close down following the launch of CIYM-FM 100.9 in Brighton.
Upon approval, the station received a new callsign, CHJJ-FM.

On June 16, 2014, UCB Canada received approval to add a new low power 50 watt transmitter at Maynooth, which will operate at 94.7 MHz.

References

External links

 

Kjj
Kjj
Radio stations established in 2003
2003 establishments in Ontario